Ball of the Damned is the fourth full-length album by the German speed metal band Scanner. It was released in 1997 by Massacre Records.

Track listing 
"Puppet on a String" – 6:52
"Frozen Under the Sun" – 5:55
"We Start It Tomorrow" – 4:59
"The True-Stories-Teller" – 4:05
"Tollshocked" – 4:05
"Lord Barker's Theme" – 1:15
"Ball of the Damned" – 6:16
"Judge on the Run" – 4:15
"Intermezzo" – 1:19
"Innuendo" (Queen cover) – 5:01

Credits 
Leszek Szpigiel – vocals
Axel Julius – guitars
Stefan Nicolai – guitars
Stephan Braun – keyboards
Marc Simon – bass
D. D. Bucco – drums
Gerald Salomon – organ
Ralf Scheepers – guest vocals on "Puppet on a String"

References 

1997 albums
Scanner (band) albums
Massacre Records albums